General Muhammad Aziz Khan  (1 January 1947), best known as Aziz Khan, is a retired four-star rank army general in the Pakistan Army who served as the 11th Chairman of the Joint Chiefs of Staff Committee, appointed in October 2001 until his retirement in 2005.

Before surprisingly superseding several military officers for the appointment as the Chairman joint chiefs in 2001, Gen. Aziz was the leading general who commanded the Northern Command against the Indian Army in the 1999 Kargil War.

In 1999, Prime Minister Nawaz Sharif had tried to stop a commercial flight from landing with Army Chief Pervez Musharraf onboard so Sharif could appoint a new Army Chief. As a result, Aziz was one of the four army generals who helped to initiate the military turnover, after the plane landed, against the civilian government of Prime Minister Nawaz Sharif.

Biography

Muhammad Aziz Khan was born in Pallandri, Sudhanoti, in British India now Azad Kashmir, Pakistan) on 1 January 1947 to a Sudhan Pashtun family. He first graduating from the High School Palandri, before joining the joined the Pakistan Army in 1964. He first completed his combat duty with the army during the second war with India in 1965, before being redirected to join the Pakistan Military Academy (PMA).

In 1966, Aziz passed out from the PMA with the class of 1st War Course, which is senior to 37th PMA but junior to 38th PMA Long Course, gaining commissioned as 2nd-Lt. in the 12th Battalion of the Punjab Regiment. He went to command an infantry platoon during the third war with India in 1971, and was later sent to attend the Command and Staff College where he qualified as a psc. He later went to attend the National Defence University where he graduated with MSc in War studies. In 1980s, Lt-Col. Aziz commanded the 12th Battalion before joining the Zia administration's staff.

In 1980s, Colonel Aziz was selected to be appointed as Military Secretary to President Zia-ul-Haq, assisting him when President Zia went on a state visit to the United States to meet with U.S. President Ronald Reagan. He was later posted as military attaché at the Pakistan Embassy in Washington D.C. for the United States Army to maintain military relations with the U.S. military.

In 1990, Brigadier Aziz was posted as the Chief of Staff of the X Corps which was under Lt. Gen. G.M. Malik before being stationed in Siachen to command the Northern Light Infantry (NLI). In 1991–94, Brig. Aziz eventually moved to command the 80th Brigade attached to the Northern Command stationed in the Azad Kashmir.

War and Command appointments in the military

Chief of General Staff and Kargil war with India

In 1994, Brig. Aziz was promoted as two-star rank when he posted as the GOC of the Force Command North based in Gilgit-Baltistan in Pakistan. Maj-Gen. Aziz served as the GOC of the Northern Command until 1996 when he was promoted to the three-star rank, leaving the command of Maj-Gen. Javed Hassan.

In 1996, Lt. Gen. Aziz was posted to the ISI, directing the ISI's analysis department, which had been responsible for providing analysis and gathering intelligence in India and Afghanistan, until 1998. Lt. Gen. Aziz was mainly responsible in keeping intelligence on the Talibans in Afghanistan, and had reputation in the country for his ultraconservative views.

In October 1998, Lt. Gen. Aziz was moved to the Army GHQ where he was appointed as the Chief of General Staff, a second-in-command post under the Chief of Army Staff. Himself a Kashmiri, Gen. Aziz was fully committed to the Kashmir cause, he began implementing the plan for covert infiltration in Indian occupied Kashmir, with the approval of the Chief of Army Staff.

Later investigative reports compiled by Pakistani historians and journalists, it was revealed that Lt. Gen. Aziz was the leading general who was masterminding the area contingency operations of the Norther Command led by its GOC Maj-Gen. Javed Hassan. Despite being well aware of the consequences, the writers critically questioned Lt. Gen. Aziz's grand strategy that brought the two nations at the brink of war, with international opinion widely accepting the Indian narrative.

During the heights of the military actions in Kargil region, the Indian intelligence was able to tape the telephonic conversations that took place between the CJCSC and Army Chief Gen. Pervez Musharraf and Chief of General Staff Lt. Gen. Aziz, proving that it was the Pakistan Army that had infiltrated without the official approval from the civilian branch, the government led by Prime Minister Nawaz Sharif. When the conversations were leaked by the India's Union Ministry of Defence, Prime Minister Sharif met with Lt. Gen. Aziz who continuously denied the authenticity of the tapes, later confided to Chairman joint chiefs Musharraf that the success of operation relied on "total secrecy."

Later Pakistani Investigative journalist news reports identified that there were four army generals who were in much control of the area contingency plans in Kargil including Lt. Gen. Mahmud Ahmed, commanding the X Corps, Lt. Gen. Shahid Aziz of ISI's Analysis Wing, and Lt. Gen. Jan Orakzai, commanding the XI Corps, besides Lt. Gen. Aziz.

After the Kargil incident, there were no official military inquiries into this incident nor there were any subsequent evidence that led to the punishment of those responsible for such incidents.

On 12 October 1999, Lt. Gen. Aziz played a decisive role in initiating the military takeover of the civilian government led by Prime Minister Nawaz Sharif when he refused to transfer the control of the military to General Ziauddin Butt. Passing orders to take over the control of the Jinnah Terminal in Karachi, Lt. Gen. Aziz effectively gained control of the military in favor of the Gen. Pervez Musharraf who removed Prime Minister Nawaz Sharif and his administration.

After the President Clinton paid a state visit to Pakistan in 2000, Lt. Gen. Aziz was removed from his position and was appointed as the field commander of the IV Corps stationed in Lahore, which he commanded until 2001.

Chairman Joint chiefs

On 6 October 2001, Lt. Gen. Aziz was surprisingly promoted to four-star rank with an immediate effect when he was appointed as the Chairman joint chiefs.

This promotion was one of the earliest controversial decisions made by the Musharraf administration, where news media had been very critical of this appointment.  At the time of the promotion, Lt. Gen. Aziz was sixth in the seniority with senior army generals who were in the race of promotion to four-star included with seniority:

Lt. Gen. Muzaffar Usmani –Vice-Chief of Army Staff at Army GHQ in Rawalpindi
Lt-Gen. Hamid Javaid– Chief of Staff to the President of Pakistan
Lt-Gen. Mahmud Ahmed– DG ISI 
Lt-Gen. Khalid Maqbool–Chairman of the National Accountability Bureau (NAB) in Islamabad
Lt-Gen. Yusaf Khan–Chief of General Staff (CGS) at Army GHQ in Rawalpindi
Lt-Gen. Aziz Khan–Field Commander of the IV Corps, stationed in Lahor, Punjab, Pakistan

While Gen. Yusaf and Gen. Aziz were elevated to their four-star commanding appointments, the remaining four army generals seek their retirement when they tendered their resignations. Resignations of Mahmud Ahmed and Osmani were widely rumoured due to their closeness to the terrorists outfits. He also stayed as the Colonel-in-Chief of the Punjab Regiment appointed by General Pervez Musharraf on 21 March 2003.

Upon appointed, Gen. Aziz called on President Musharraf, thanking the president for the promotion. Despite his initial support for Gen. Musharraf, Aziz Khan soon regretted playing his part in bringing to help stabilize Gen. Pervez Musharraf's role against the civilian government when he lectured and quoted: "politics should not be done in uniform."

In 2001, Gen. Aziz publicly came out against President Pervez Musharraf's policy on siding with the United States, without effectively addressing the issue of containing the terrorists organizations. He viewed the American attack on Afghanistan with great suspicion, and had held sympathetic views towards the Talibans in Afghanistan, and harboured strong anti-American views when he termed the Americans as "number one enemy".

In a response to the terrorist attack on Indian parliament in 2001, Gen. Aziz oversaw the troop deployment across the border amid the military standoff, and supportive towards the Chinese mediation between the relations of two countries.

In 2003, Gen. Aziz went to visit Sri Lanka where he met with Sri Lankan President Chandrika Kumaratunga where he agreed to provide military assistance to Sri Lanka to their civil war. In 2005, Gen. Aziz's timely retirement was confirmed by President Musharraf and disassociate himself with Aziz with further political appointments despite rumors. Gen. Aziz was succeeded by Gen. Ehsan ul Haq, amid another controversial appointment in 2004.

Awards and decorations

Foreign decorations

See also 

Anti-American sentiment in Pakistan
Fiscal-military state
Gang of Four in Pakistan Army
Islamic fundamentalism
Kashmiriyat
Pakistan Army and state-sponsored terrorism
Power and politics
State within a state

References

External links
'The Mullahs' Blue-Eyed General'

|-

1947 births
Kashmiri people
People from Sudhanoti District
People from Azad Kashmir
Pakistan Military Academy alumni
Pakistani military personnel of the Indo-Pakistani War of 1971
National Defence University, Pakistan alumni
Pakistani expatriates in the United States
Pakistani spies
Islamism in Pakistan
Kashmir conflict
People of the Kargil War
Anti-Americanism
Chairmen Joint Chiefs of Staff Committee
Pakistani generals
Pakistan Hockey Federation presidents
People of the Sri Lankan Civil War
Living people